Knight Rider 2010 is a 1994 American science fiction action television film directed by Sam Pillsbury and written by John Leekley, loosely based on the television series Knight Rider. The film stars Richard Joseph Paul, Heidi Leick, Michael Beach, and Don McManus. It aired in syndication in the United States on February 13, 1994, as part of Universal Television's Action Pack programming block.

Plot 
In a Mad Max style future, Jake McQueen is the ultimate smuggler, smuggling in Mexicans for money to survive, only for his smuggling to come to a halt when he is busted by his brother while getting his truck repaired.

However, what he doesn't know is that he is under observation by Jared, the crippled head of Chrysalis Corporation, who sends one of his most valued employees, Hannah Tyree, to bring him in to work for them as part of their video games division.

Jake initially is skeptical about the idea of working with Hannah, and is scared away when she admits that she accidentally downloaded herself onto PRISM, a crystalline solid-state memory unit for her computer, once, due to an unexpected side-effect.

Jake is then hunted down after Jared has his data, and eventually finds his way back home, only to find his father near death. Acquiring a junked Mustang, and a special engine his father had kept in trust, he goes to find a way to stop Chrysalis.

While pursuing a lead, he ends up shot, and is witness to Hannah's apparent death, only to find she was trapped in her PRISM. Going into battle against Jared, with Hannah as his car's new AI, Jake eventually destroys Jared when Jake discovers the one side effect of Jared's life support: that it is slowly killing the person it protects.

Now, Jake and Hannah travel the world of the future, fighting for justice in a lawless desert that is forgotten by the world.

Cast 
 Richard Joseph Paul as Jake McQueen
 Heidi Leick as Hannah Tyrie
 Michael Beach as Marshal Will McQueen
 Don McManus as Dean
 Nicky Katt  as Johnny
 Badja Djola as Zeke
 Mark Pellegrino as Robert Lee
 Brion James as Jared

Production

Development
The early drafts of the script were far closer to the original series even including KITT (who would have been a female); however, the makers believed at that time there would be no high-tech cars. Ultimately this movie had little in common with Knight Rider'''s basic concept, except the title, a talking car, and the "one man can make a difference" concept.

Vehicle
The car is a custom "Ford Mustang" built on an MN12 1994 Ford Thunderbird chassis; its grunge style is very different from the sleek Pontiac cars that were the two incarnations of KITT, whose AI would have been removed and replaced with K.D. (Hannah Tyrie).

 See also 

 Knight Rider franchise
 Knight Rider 2000''

External links 
 
 

1994 television films
1994 films
1994 action films
1994 science fiction films
1990s American films
1990s English-language films
1990s science fiction action films
Action Pack (TV programming block)
Action television films
American science fiction action films
American science fiction television films
Films directed by Sam Pillsbury
Films set in 2010
Knight Rider films
Television films based on television series
Universal Pictures films